The Incredibly Strange Creatures Who Stopped Living and Became Mixed-Up Zombies (sometimes "!!?" is appended to the title) is a 1964 American monster movie written and directed by Ray Dennis Steckler. Steckler also starred in the film, billed under the pseudonym "Cash Flagg". Upon release, the film received negative reviews and is regarded by some critics as being one of the worst movies ever made. The film was lampooned in a 1997 episode of the cult sci-fi TV series Mystery Science Theater 3000.

In the film, three friends visit a carnival and stumble onto a group of occultists and disfigured monsters.  Produced on a $38,000 budget, much of it takes place at The Pike amusement park in Long Beach, California, which resembles Brooklyn's Coney Island. The film was billed as the first "monster musical," beating out The Horror of Party Beach by a mere month in release date.

Plot 
Free-spirited Jerry (Steckler as "Flagg"), his girlfriend Angela (Sharon Walsh), and his buddy Harold (Atlas King) head out for a day at a seaside carnival. In one venue, a dance number is performed by Marge (Carolyn Brandt), a superstitious alcoholic who drinks before and between shows, and her partner, Bill Ward, for a small audience. Backstage, Marge sees a black cat and, disturbed by its appearance, visits powerful carnival fortune-teller Estrella (Brett O'Hara) to find out what it means. In her fortune-telling booth, Estrella predicts death for Marge, who runs out, terrified, past Jerry, Angela, and Harold. The three decide to have their fortunes told. Estrella predicts "a death near water" for someone close to Angela.

After leaving Estrella's booth, Jerry sees Estrella's sister Carmelita (Erina Enyo), a stripper who hypnotizes him with her icy stare, and he is compelled to see her act. Angela leaves the carnival, disgusted, with Harold in tow. After the show, Jerry is tricked backstage into Estrella's room with a note and she turns Jerry into a zombie by hypnotizing him with a spiraling wheel. Jerry then goes on a violent overnight rampage of which he will have no memory, killing Marge and fatally wounding Bill. The next day, Jerry attempts to strangle his girlfriend Angela as well. It develops that Estrella, with her henchman Ortega (Jack Brady), has been turning carnival patrons into zombies by throwing acid into their faces, disfiguring them, and then imprisoning them in her fortune-telling booth.

Interspersed through the film are several song-and-dance production numbers in the carnival's nightclub, with songs like "Choo Choo Ch'Boogie" and "Shook Out of Shape."

Jerry, suspicious of his fragmented memory, confronts Estrella at the carnival. He is hypnotized a second time, and that night stabs a carnival showgirl and barker in the showgirl's home. Returning to Estrella, she throws acid in Jerry's face and attempts to imprison him, only to have her other zombies escape. The zombies immediately kill Estrella, Carmelita, Ortega, and several performers before being shot by police. Jerry, himself partially disfigured but not completely a zombie escapes the carnival and is pursued to the shoreline, where the police shoot him dead in front of Angela and Harold. Estrella's prediction of "a death near water" for someone close to Angela is fulfilled.

Production and release

Title 
At the time of release, The Incredibly Strange Creatures Who Stopped Living and Became Mixed-Up Zombies was the second-longest titled film in the horror genre (Roger Corman's The Saga of the Viking Women and Their Voyage to the Waters of the Great Sea Serpent being the first and was also parodied by Mystery Science Theater 3000).

This was not, however, the originally intended title of the film. As Steckler relates, the film was supposed to be titled The Incredibly Strange Creatures, or Why I Stopped Living and Became a Mixed-up Zombie, but was changed in response to Columbia Pictures' threat of a lawsuit over the name's similarity to Dr. Strangelove or: How I Learned to Stop Worrying and Love the Bomb, which was under production at the same time. Steckler later joked that he could have made 5 movies for what they probably spent on lawyers.

The film was originally released by Fairway-International Pictures, Arch Hall Sr.'s studio, who put it on the lower half of a double bill with one of his own pictures. Dissatisfied, Steckler bought the distribution rights back from Hall, and purchased the rights to the Coleman Francis picture that was also poked fun by MST3K, The Beast of Yucca Flats and roadshowed the picture across the U.S. In order to get repeat customers, Steckler re-titled the film numerous times, with titles such as The Incredibly Mixed-Up Zombie, Diabolical Dr. Voodoo and The Teenage Psycho Meets Bloody Mary.

Studio 
Much of the movie was filmed in an old, long-empty Masonic temple in Glendale, California, owned by actor Rock Hudson. The nine-story building was a series of makeshift "sound stages" stacked floor after floor, some big enough to create the midway scenes indoors. This was the studio that was used that year for the production of The Creeping Terror, another low-quality monster movie also spoofed by MST3K. The Film Center Studios were popular with non-union producers because they could turn off the elevator to lock out IATSE union agents, who found it difficult to climb the stairs to the seventh-floor main stage.

Budget
During the filming of the movie, Steckler was in terrible need of funds, both for the movie and for rent, food, and basic needs. Atlas King, who had grown close to Steckler, gave him three hundred dollars out of his own pocket. The station wagon Jerry drives in this movie was the Steckler family car.

Notable cast and crew 
Brett O'Hara was usually a stand-in for Susan Hayward. Madame Estrella was the only "real" role of her career.

Sharon Walsh was not originally meant to play Angela. Bonita Jade was given the role, but when it was time for her scene, she said she had to leave to meet her drummer boyfriend because he was performing and she always went to his gigs. Steckler was furious, and he pulled Walsh out of the chorus line, telling her she was now the female lead. Walsh had already appeared in several dance numbers during the movie and they had to "disguise" her with a new, "beehive" hairstyle.

The cinematography/camera operation was done by three men who would go on to become major figures in cinematography: Joseph V. Mascelli, author of The Five Cs of Cinematography; Vilmos Zsigmond (listed as William Zsigmond), who would later win an Academy Award for his work on Close Encounters of the Third Kind;  and László Kovács (listed as Leslie Kovacs).

In some screenings, employees in monster masks, sometimes including Steckler himself, would run into the theater to scare the audience (the gimmick was billed as "Hallucinogenic Hypnovision" on the film's posters).

Reception and legacy

Ever since its release, many critics have cited it as the worst film ever made.

The 2004 DVD The 50 Worst Movies Ever Made listed this film as the worst film of all time.

However, the film has since become a cult classic and has been celebrated by fans of B movies, camp or kitsch films. Leonard Maltin awarded the film two and a half out of a possible four stars (his most widely used rating), complementing the film's use of colors and haunting atmosphere while criticizing the film's acting, dialogue, and simplistic plot. Writing for Turner Classic Movies, critic Richard Harland Smith described the film as "junk drawer cinema at its most impossible to close" and "loose-knit to the point of unraveling," but opined that "it's precisely this threadbare, developed-in-the-bathroom-sink aesthetic that explains the film's confounding charm" and that the film is "considerably better than its reputation."

The rock critic Lester Bangs wrote an appreciative 1973 essay about Incredibly Strange Creatures in which he tries to explain and justify the movie's value: 
It currently has a 20% "Rotten" rating on Rotten Tomatoes.

The DVD release of Incredibly Strange Creatures features commentary tracks by Steckler as well as "drive-in movie critic" Joe Bob Briggs.

See also
List of American films of 1964
List of films considered the worst
Night of the Living Dead
Carnival of Souls

Notes

References

External links 
 
 
 

1964 films
1964 horror films
1960s musical films
American zombie films
American independent films
1960s English-language films
Films set in amusement parks
Films shot in the Las Vegas Valley
Films shot in Los Angeles
1964 independent films
1960s American films